Three Town Senior High School (TTSS) is a second cycle institution located in Hedzranawo-Denu in the Ketu South Municipal,  Volta Region of Ghana.

History 
It was established in January 1991 as a day school, making it among the oldest schools in Southern Volta, until it was absorbed by the government. The name Threetown is as a result of the schools location in the heart of three towns; Denu, Hedzranawo and Adafienu. The school took part in the National Science and Maths Quiz at the regional level.

Courses Offered 
General Arts

Visual Arts

Home Economics

Business

Agricultural Science

General Science

Facilities 
Boarding

Science Lab

Computer Lab

References 

High schools in Ghana
Education in Volta Region
Educational institutions established in 1991
1991 establishments in Ghana